An annular solar eclipse occurred at the moon's descending node of its orbit on Tuesday, May 10, 1994. It was visible over a wide swath of North America, from Baja California across the Midwest of the United States up through Ontario and Nova Scotia in Canada. Occurring only 1.6 days after apogee (Perigee on Monday, May 9, 1994 at 02:18 UTC or Sunday, May 8, 1994 at 22:18 EDT or 19:18 PDT), the moon's apparent diameter was smaller than the sun. This solar eclipse belonged to Saros series 128.

The Annular Eclipse of May 10, 1994
A solar eclipse occurs when the Moon passes between Earth and the Sun, thereby totally or partly obscuring the image of the Sun for a viewer on Earth. If the eclipse is a central one, it will be either total, annular or a combination of both, called a hybrid eclipse. In a total eclipse, the moon's size as seen from earth is large enough to block all of the disk of the sun.

An annular solar eclipse occurs when the Moon's apparent diameter is smaller than the Sun's, blocking most of the Sun's light and causing the Sun to look like an annulus (ring), which means there is a ring of light from the sun around the dark moon. An annular eclipse appears as a partial eclipse over a region of the Earth thousands of kilometres wide.

The path of annularity crossed four states of Mexico (Baja California Sur, Baja California, Sonora and Chihuahua), the United States, the Canadian provinces of Ontario, Nova Scotia and the southeastern tip of Quebec, Azores Islands except Santa Maria Island, and part of Morocco including the capital city Rabat. Niagara Falls was also covered by the path of annularity.

The eclipse reached its moment of "greatest eclipse" in the United States near Wauseon, Ohio, about 35 miles west of Toledo, Ohio.

The Columbus Crew were originally named the "Columbus Eclipse" in their Major League Soccer bid in honor of the event.

Images

Related eclipses

Eclipses of 1994 
 An annular solar eclipse on May 10.
 A partial lunar eclipse on May 25.
 A total solar eclipse on November 3.
 A penumbral lunar eclipse on November 18.

Solar eclipses 1993–1996

Saros 128

Inex series

Metonic cycle

References

External links
 Example of total versus annular eclipse

Photos:
 Solstice And Season's Eclipse APOD 21 December 2000, partial annular eclipse

1994 5 10
1994 in science
1994 5 10
May 1994 events